Sohn may refer to 

a German word meaning "son";
an alternate transliteration of the Korean name Son;
Sohn (musician), a Vienna-based English musician, songwriter, and producer

Sohn is the surname of:
 Sohn Kee-chung (孫基禎) — the first medal-winning Korean Olympian
 Alfred Sohn-Rethel (1899–1990), German social scientist
 Alfred Sohn-Rethel (painter) (1875–1958), German Classical Modernist painter
 Else Sohn-Rethel (1863–1933), German painter and singer in the mid to late 19th-century.
 Karli Sohn-Rethel (1882–1966) German Classical Modernist painter
 Otto Sohn-Rethel (1877–1949), German painter and lepidopterist
 Amy Sohn, American author, columnist and screenwriter
 Clem Sohn (1910-1937), American human flight pioneer
 Joseph Sohn, contributor to the Jewish Encyclopedia, "The New International Encyclopedia"
 Karl Ferdinand Sohn (1805–1867), German landscape painter
 Karl Rudolf Sohn (1845–1908), German painter
 Kurt Sohn, New York Jets wide receiver, 1981-1988
 Louis B. Sohn (1914-2006) East-European politician, author
 Lydia Sohn, American mechanical and bio-engineer
Patricia Sohn (aka Patricia Woods), America political scientist
Peter Sohn, American animator and voice actor
 Sonja Sohn, American actress
 Wilhelm Sohn (1830–1899), German painter

See also
 Sone
 Zone (disambiguation)
 Zoon

Jewish surnames